Standesamt Usch was a civil registration district (Standesamt) located in Kreis Kolmar, province of Posen of the German Empire (1871-1918) and administered the communities of:

Kol = Kolmar; Sch = Schneidemühl; Usc = Usch
Population data may be inaccurate (see German census of 1895).

This article is part of the project Wikipedia:WikiProject Prussian Standesamter. Please refer to the project page, before making changes.

Geography of Prussia
Civil registration offices in the Province of Posen